The Cenușarul is a left tributary of the river Câlniștea in Romania. It flows into the Câlniștea in Târnava.

References

Rivers of Romania
Rivers of Teleorman County